Ginger Productions, alongside STV Studios, is part of the network production arm of STV Group plc. Based in Waterhouse Square in London, the company's output focuses on Entertainment and Factual Entertainment programming. Ginger was acquired as part of STV's acquisition of the Ginger Media Group in 1999.

Ginger Productions have created TFI Friday, The Priory and Don't Forget Your Toothbrush – which is a format which can now be seen across the globe - Detox Camp and Celebrity Detox Camp (Channel 5) brought the nation's attention to the extreme holistic treatment of caffeine enemas in Thailand. This was followed up in 2005 with Extreme Celebrity Detox for Channel 4, which challenged celebrities to try out some of the most unusual and challenging detox regimes on offer. The Tribute to the Likely Lads for ITV starring Ant & Dec. Don't Drop the Coffin (ITV). This series followed the day-to-day activities of a team of South London undertakers and was one of the most talked about programmes in 2003.

Ginger Productions is also responsible for the multi-award-winning Cannibals and Crampons for BBC One, which helped launched the career of Bruce Parry. Other Ginger Productions include The True Story of Ferrari for BBC One and the Channel 4 drama series Lock Stock..., based on the seminal London gangster film.

In 2005, Ginger began producing Jack Osbourne: Adrenaline Junkie, a documentary series for ITV2. The team film Jack around the world as he attempts challenges. The series has been sold to 12 territories including New Zealand, Korea and Discovery Travel in USA. To date, four series of Adrenaline Junkie have aired on ITV2. Ginger Productions made another show for ITV2, with Jack Osbourne's sister as the star of Kelly Osbourne: Turning Japanese in 2006. Other programming titles have included Whatever, a daily TV show for Sky1 and Take Me to the Edge, a reality series for Virgin1.

The company has been listed as a dormant company since at least 2019.

References

External links
 Ginger Productions  (Redirects to STV Studios)

 
British companies established in 1994
STV Group
Television production companies of the United Kingdom